There's a Light That Enters Houses with No Other House in Sight is a 2014 experimental album by David Sylvian. The album consists of a single hour-length composition and features spoken word by American Pulitzer Prize winning poet Franz Wright, as well as contributions from musicians Christian Fennesz and John Tilbury.

Track listing

Personnel

Musicians
 David Sylvian – piano, sampler, computer, electronics, laptop
 Christian Fennesz – guitar, laptop
 John Tilbury – piano
 Franz Wright – spoken word

Production
 Chris Bigg – design
 Tony Cousins – mastering
 Nicholas Hughes – cover photography
 Alfred A. Knopf – recording arrangement
 David La Spina – photography
 David Sylvian – art direction, engineering, production

References

2014 albums
David Sylvian albums